A rock garden is a type of garden that features extensive use of rocks or stones, along with plants native to rocky or alpine environments.

Rock garden may also refer to:

 Alpine garden, a domestic or botanical garden specialising in the collection and cultivation of alpine plants growing naturally at high altitudes around the world
 An area of exposed rocks on a wilderness watercourse, such as the Back River
 Japanese rock garden, also called a zen garden, creates a miniature stylized landscape
 Rock Garden of Chandigarh, India, a sculpture garden
 Rock Garden, Darjeeling, West Bengal, India, a road-side picnic ground around a natural waterfall
 Rock Garden (album), a 2006 album by Ty Tabor
 Rock Garden, a music venue located in Covent Garden, London during the late 1970s and 1980s

See also

 
 
 Rock the Garden, an annual summer music festival in Minneapolis, Minnesota, US
 Rockery (disambiguation)